A mudpot, or mud pool, is a sort of acidic hot spring, or fumarole, with limited water. It usually takes the form of a pool of bubbling mud. The acid and microorganisms decompose surrounding rock into clay and mud.

Description
The mud of a mudpot takes the form of a viscous, often bubbling, slurry. As the boiling mud is often squirted over the brims of the mudpot, a sort of mini-volcano of mud starts to build up, sometimes reaching heights of 1 to 1.5 meters. Although mudpots are often called "mud volcanoes", true mud volcanoes are very different in nature. The mud of a mudpot is generally of white to greyish color, but is sometimes stained with reddish or pink spots from iron compounds. When the slurry is particularly colorful, the feature may be referred to as a paint pot.

Geology
Mudpots form in high-temperature geothermal areas where water is in short supply. The little water that is available rises to the surface at a spot where the soil is rich in volcanic ash, clay, and other fine particulates. The thickness of the mud usually changes along with seasonal changes in the water table.

Notable sites
The geothermal areas of Yellowstone National Park contain several notable examples of both mudpots and paint pots, as do some areas of Azerbaijan, Iceland, New Zealand and Nicaragua. 

Several locations in and around the Salton Sea in California are also home to active mudpots, including the moving Niland Geyser. In the case of Niland Geyser, its name is somewhat of a misnomer, as the release of carbon dioxide by seismic activity from the nearby San Andreas Fault is responsible for its behaviour, rather than through geothermal activity.

Bumpass Hell in Lassen Volcanic National Park also contains mudpots.

Photo gallery

References

External links

 Mudpots at Yellowstone National Park official site
 Mudpots photo gallery at Yellowstone NP official site

Springs (hydrology)
Volcanic landforms
Volcanism
Geothermal areas
Articles containing video clips
Volcanic degassing